Julie Foggea (born 28 August 1990) is a French handballer who plays goalkeeper for french league club Brest Bretagne Handball and the France national team.

Achievements

Club 
Division 1:
Finalist: 2016 (with Fleury Loiret Handball)
EHF Challenge Cup:
Winner: 2015 (with Union Mios Biganos-Bègles)

 Coupe de la Ligue française (French league cup):
 Winner: 2016 (with Fleury Loiret Handball)
 Finalist: 2015 (with Union Mios Biganos-Bègles)
 Hungarian league (Nemzeti Bajnokság I):
 3rd: 2018 (with Érd HC)
 4th: 2019 (with Érd HC)
 Hungarian Cup (Magyar Kupa):
 Finalist: 2018 (with Érd HC)
 3rd: 2019 (with Érd HC)
 Romanian league (Liga Națională):
 Winner: 2022 (with CS Rapid București)

References

1990 births
Living people
People from Les Abymes
French female handball players
Expatriate handball players
French expatriate sportspeople in Hungary
French expatriate sportspeople in Romania
French people of Guadeloupean descent